Janice Jennifer Eng (born 1963) is a professor in the University of British Columbia's Department of Physical Therapy and Canada Research Chair (Tier 1) in Neurological Rehabilitation.

Early life and education

Janice Eng was born in 1963. She earned her undergraduate degree at the University of British Columbia (UBC) with a combined degree in physical therapy and occupational therapy before moving to Ontario and enrolling at the University of Toronto for her MSc in Biomedical Engineering. Upon earning her Master's degree, she completed her doctorate in kinesiology at the University of Waterloo and returned to British Columbia for her post-doctoral training in Neurophysiology at Simon Fraser University.

Career
Upon completing her post-doctoral training, Eng accepted a professorship position in the University of British Columbia's Department of Physical Therapy. During her early tenure at the institution, Eng developed a rehabilitation research program to assist stroke and spinal cord injury survivors. She has now published over 300 peer-reviewed journal publication from this research.

Her research has developed many new treatments to improve recovery after a stroke.  In 2005, she developed the Fitness and Mobility Exercise (FAME) evidence-based exercise program to assist people recovering from a stroke, Parkinson's disease, MS and frail older adults. It has been shown to improve strength, balance, cardiovascular fitness, bone density and reduce falls in people working to regain mobility following neurological injury.  FAME has also had excellent uptake and is delivered in hundreds of hospitals and community centres around the world, including sites in Canada, Australia and Brazil.

Her team devised the Graded Repetitive Arm Supplementary Program (GRASP) in 2009 which consisted of a set of exercises for the arm and hand that improved recovery of arm function in stroke patients.  The original study operated over four sites in British Columbia. This Program is cited in the Canadian Best Practice Stroke Guidelines as providing evidence for the need of supplementary exercise to improve upper extremity outcomes after stroke.  GRASP has had widespread uptake around the world and is used in over 8500 sites over 58 countries.  A published UK survey showed that 35% stroke therapists use GRASP. She has since developed variations of GRASP for delivery over the phone, as a group program, as a virtual group program, and as a program coupled with a wearable sensor to motivate practice.

In 2015, Eng was the recipient of a prestigious and highly competitive 7-year  Canadian Institutes of Health Research Foundation grant to fund her rehabilitative program research to aid stroke survivors.

In 2019, Eng established the Exoskeleton for post-Stroke Recovery of Ambulation (ExStRA) study to use a robotic exoskeleton for early walking practice after a stroke. The study operated over three provinces (BC, AB, ON) and demonstrated the feasibility of integrating advanced wearable robots with standard of care physical therapy services in the hospital. She also co-led a Canadian Institute for Health Research study which paired outpatients with coaches to prevent a second stroke. Within the first six months, patients were shown to have improved quality of life and reduced stroke risk factors.

Dr. Eng co-directs the CanStroke Recovery Platform which is an 8-site national clinical trials platform to test new Canadian approaches in stroke recovery. She is on the Board of Directors of the Heart and Stroke Foundation Canadian Partnership for Stroke.

Her research in spinal cord injury has resulted in the Spinal Cord Injury Research Evidence (SCIRE) Project, a website operating since 2005. SCIRE Professional is a free, accessible platform that provides clinically relevant content such as instructional videos and toolkits to help clinicians provide the best care to patients. SCIRE Community provides information for people with spinal cord injury and their families. SCIRE is accessed by more than a  million users annually. SCIRE has supported the development of clinical practice guidelines, including the Canadian Spinal Cord Injury Best Practice Guideline In 2020 and Guidelines from the Paralyzed Veterans of American since 2018.

Awards and honours 

 2021 - The University of British Columbia, University Killam Professor that is the highest honour conferred on a faculty
 2020 - Université Laval, Honorary Doctorate in Rehabilitation Sciences
 2017 - Springfield College, Greene Lecturer in Physical Therapy
 2016 - Awarded a Tier 1 Canada Research Chair for being "recognized as a leader in rehabilitation research."
 2015 - Distinguished Medical Lecturer Award in Clinical Sciences.
 2012 - The University of British Columbia, Faculty of Medicine, Distinguished Achievement Award for Overall Excellence
 2010 - The YWCA Vancouver, Women of Distinction Award in the category of Health and Active Living.
 2010 - The University of British Columbia, Faculty of Medicine, Excellence in Mentoring Early Career Faculty
 2009 - Canadian Academy of Health Sciences, Inducted Fellow
 2009 - March of Dimes Canada, Jonas Salk Award Award for lifetime achievements in reducing physical disability
 2008 - Michael Smith Foundation for Health Research, Senior Scholar Award
 2007 - The University of British Columbia, Faculty of Medicine, Distinguished Accomplishment
 2006 - Killam Trust, Killam Research Prize
 2003 to 2008 - Canadian Institute of Health Research, New Investigator Award
 2003 to 2008 - Michael Smith Foundation for Health Research, Scholar Award

References

External links
 

Living people
1963 births
University of British Columbia alumni
University of Toronto alumni
University of Waterloo alumni
Canada Research Chairs
Academic staff of the University of British Columbia